The 1956 NCAA Swimming and Diving Championships were contested in March 1956 at Kiputh Pool at Payne Whitney Gymnasium at Yale University in New Haven, Connecticut at the 20th annual NCAA-sanctioned swim meet to determine the team and individual national champions of men's collegiate swimming and diving in the United States. 

Ohio State once again retained the national title, the Buckeyes' tenth, after finishing fourteen points ahead of hosts Yale in the team standings.

Team standings
Note: Top 10 only
(H) = Hosts
Full results

See also
List of college swimming and diving teams

References

NCAA Division I Men's Swimming and Diving Championships
NCAA Swimming And Diving Championships
NCAA Swimming And Diving Championships
NCAA Swimming And Diving Championships